Athanasius II (1229 – d. 1247+) was the Greek Orthodox Patriarch of Jerusalem from  1231 to 1244. The Church of the Holy Sepulchre seems to have been largely in Athanasius' hands during the Latin control of Jerusalem. The Serbian Archbishop Sava (1174–1237) guested Athanasius twice in the Holy Land, and according to Serbian chronicles they were good friends. After the Latin retreat from Jerusalem in 1244, the Melkites (who were the majority of the south of the Latin kingdom) turned to Athanasius. Athanasius II was in negotiations with the Pope through friar Lawrence of Portugal in 1247; Innocent IV supported him against the Latin patriarch, Robert.

References

Sources

12th-century births
1247 deaths
13th-century Greek Orthodox Patriarchs of Jerusalem
13th-century people of the Kingdom of Jerusalem